Hotchkiss v. National City Bank of N.Y., 200 F. 287, 293 (S.D.N.Y. 1911) was a landmark case in contract law articulating the Objective Theory of Contracts and dealing with the meaning of a promise in a contract. To wit, Judge Learned Hand opined: "A contract has, strictly speaking, nothing to do with the personal, or individual, intent of the parties. A contract is an obligation attached by the mere force of law to certain acts of the parties, usually words, which ordinarily accompany and represent a known intent. If, however, it were proved by twenty bishops that either party when he used the words intended something else than the usual meaning which the law imposes on them, he would still be held, unless there were mutual mistake or something else of the sort."

See also 
Lucy v. Zehmer
Judge Learned Hand
Contracts
Smith v. Hughes

External links and sources
WordPress.com: Briefs for Contracts with JJ White

United States contract case law
United States District Court for the Southern District of New York cases
1911 in United States case law
United States District Court case articles without infoboxes